Percie Chater Charlton (9 April 1867 – 30 September 1954) was an Australian cricketer who played in two Tests in England in 1890 and played first-class cricket for New South Wales from 1888 to 1897.

Cricket career
Charlton was regarded as an all-rounder, but he was more successful with his fast-medium bowling than with his batting. He was also an excellent slips fieldsman. A return of 7 for 44 against South Australia in February 1890 led to his selection in the Australian team to tour England later that year.

In his two Test matches in England, he didn't score many runs (6,2,10,11) but can claim the "honour" of being dismissed LBW to WG Grace in the second innings of the first test. Charlton didn't bowl in the first test, however in the first innings of the second he took 3 wickets for 18 runs off 6 overs. Unfortunately, he didn't get a decent opportunity to bowl as it seems in this early period of cricket both teams had a strong tendency to bowl their two top bowlers "into the ground". For example, Australia's two top bowlers in the second innings of the first test bowling 48 overs between them with only Charlton bowling the other 6. This was more the rule than the exception at least during this series.

He played cricket for many years for I Zingari, and served as the club's president from 1928 to 1947, and its patron from 1947 till his death in 1954. He was then made its patron in perpetuity.

Life
Charlton went to school at Sydney Grammar School and became a highly qualified dentist, having graduated from the Harvard University School of Dental Medicine, studied at Edinburgh University and Glasgow University, and taught at the University of Sydney.

Charlton married Florence Bradford in the Sydney suburb of Neutral Bay on 15 May 1894. He was an uncle of the New South Wales state cricketer Claude Tozer, and also of the Olympic swimmer Boy Charlton.

See also
 List of New South Wales representative cricketers

References

External links
 

1867 births
1954 deaths
Australia Test cricketers
New South Wales cricketers
Australian cricketers
Cricketers from Sydney
Harvard School of Dental Medicine alumni
Australian dentists
People educated at Sydney Grammar School